Daorung Chuvatana also known as Surapol Sidangnoi (สุรพล สีแดงน้อย)  (born 1969-04-01 in  Nam Pat District, Uttaradit Province, Thailand) is a retired boxer who won World titles in the Bantamweight weight divisions.

Chuvatana turned pro in 1985 and in 1994 won the WBA bantamweight title by winning a decision over John Michael Johnson by controversial TKO. Near the end of the first round, Chuvatana unintentionally headbutted Johnson, causing him to sustain a cut above his right eye, however, the referee ruled that it was caused by a punch and Chuvatana was declared the winner after the ringside doctor inspected the cut and called the fight off. He lost the belt in his third defense to Veeraphol Sahaprom in 1995. He later regained the WBA bantamweight belt with a win over Nana Konadu by decision after the fight was stopped in the 10th round. He defended the title once before losing it to Konadu in a rematch the following year.

After retirement, he served as an airman noncommissioned in the Royal Thai Armed Forces Headquarters.

Other names
Daorung MP Petroleum
Daorung Chor Siriwat

References

External links
 

1969 births
Living people
Bantamweight boxers
World boxing champions
World bantamweight boxing champions
World Boxing Association champions
Daorung Chuvatana
Daorung Chuvatana
Daorung Chuvatana